São Domingos do Capim is a Brazilian municipality in the state of Pará. The estimated population is 32,139 (2020). It has an area of 1677 km2.

The city is well known for hosting a world surfing championship in the bore tides of the Guamá River, a phenomenon which is locally referred to as the pororoca. The championships take place between March and April.

References

External links

Municipalities in Pará
River surfing
Surfing locations in Brazil